Shkumbini Stadium is a multi-use stadium in Peqin, Albania. It is currently used mostly for football matches and is the home ground of KS Shkumbini.  The stadium has a capacity of 9,000 people.

References

Football venues in Albania
Multi-purpose stadiums
Buildings and structures in Peqin